Eloy Victor Room (born 6 February 1989) is a professional footballer who plays as a goalkeeper for Major League Soccer club Columbus Crew. Born in the Netherlands, he represents the Curaçao national team.

Club career

Vitesse
Room joined Vitesse at the age of thirteen, having played for numerous clubs, including SCE, local rivals NEC Nijmegen, and Union.

After impressing for the Vitesse youth sides, Room was promoted to the first-team squad for the 2008–09 campaign. On 8 March 2009, Room made his Vitesse debut in a 1–0 defeat against Volendam, replacing the injured Piet Velthuizen in the 13th minute. On 18 April 2009, Room was given his first Vitesse start by manager Theo Bos in a 2–1 victory against AZ. Room made his breakthrough in the Vitesse first-team squad in the 2010–11 campaign, following Velthuizen's departure to Spanish side Hércules, appearing thirty-three times in the league out of a possible thirty-four. However, after only a year, Velthuizen re-joined the Dutch side after struggling to adapt in Spain, therefore displacing Room once again.

On 30 June 2013, Room joined Go Ahead Eagles on a season-long loan, to gain first-team football. On 4 August 2013, Room made his Go Ahead Eagles debut in a 1–1 draw with Utrecht. On 29 January 2014, six months later, Room's loan deal at Go Ahead Eagles was cut short by Vitesse, due to an injury to back-up goalkeeper Marko Meerits. Room left Go Ahead Eagles after making twenty league starts and two cup appearances.

Although Room returned to Vitesse, he failed to make an appearance in the remainder of the 2013–14 campaign due to Velthuizen's impressive form. In the 2014–15 campaign, Room finally displaced long-term goalkeeper Velthuizen after some disappointing displays. Room went on to appear in all thirty-four league fixtures in Vitesse's 2015–16 campaign; he also played the entirety of their KNVB Cup and UEFA Europa League campaigns as well.

Room played as Vitesse won the final of the KNVB Cup 2–0 against AZ Alkmaar on 30 April 2017 to lead the club, three-time runners-up, to the title for the first time in its 125-year history.

PSV
On 16 August 2017, Room joined fellow Eredivisie side PSV after a fifteen-year spell at Vitesse.

He came off the bench on 15 April 2018 as PSV beat rivals Ajax 3–0 to clinch the 2017–18 Eredivisie title.

Columbus Crew
On 5 July 2019, Room signed with Major League Soccer club Columbus Crew on a free transfer, replacing Zack Steffen who had left the club for Manchester City. He made his debut for the club on 20 July in a 2–1 victory against the Montreal Impact. Room completed his first season with twelve appearances for the Crew, earning one clean sheet.

During the 2020 regular season, Room missed a total of six games due to injury. In the seventeen games he did appear in, he recorded seven clean sheets and a 0.88 goals against average. Room won the MLS Save of the Year for his double save in the Crew's match against Orlando City SC on 4 November, the first Crew player to win the award.

In the 2020 MLS Cup Playoffs, Room tested positive for COVID-19 and missed two games. However, the Crew would end up winning both games for which he was out. He was cleared to play in the MLS Cup final and was given the start. The Crew would go on to win, giving them their first piece of silverware since the 2009 Supporters' Shield. Room ended the 2020 season with 8 total clean sheets in 19 total appearances.

On 3 December 2021, it was announced that the Crew had re-signed Room to a two year contract extension through the 2023 MLS season with a club option for 2024. Crew president and general manager Tim Bezbatchenko stated that "Eloy has not only performed on the field, but he has also bought into the values of the Crew to become a veteran voice and leader in the locker room."

International career
Room is eligible to represent Curaçao through his father. He made his senior debut in a 1–0 win against Trinidad and Tobago on 6 June 2015. He was named man of the match.

Career statistics

Club

International

Honours
Vitesse
KNVB Cup: 2016–17

PSV
Eredivisie: 2017–18

Columbus Crew
MLS Cup: 2020

Curaçao
Caribbean Cup: 2017
King's Cup: 2019

Individual
Caribbean Cup Golden Glove: 2017
MLS Save of the Year: 2020
Columbus Crew Defensive Player of the Year: 2021, 2022

References

External links
 
 
 

Living people
1989 births
Curaçao footballers
Dutch people of Curaçao descent
Dutch footballers
Footballers from Nijmegen
Association football goalkeepers
SBV Vitesse players
Go Ahead Eagles players
PSV Eindhoven players
Jong PSV players
Columbus Crew players
Eredivisie players
Eerste Divisie players
Major League Soccer players
Curaçao international footballers
2017 CONCACAF Gold Cup players
2019 CONCACAF Gold Cup players
Curaçao expatriate footballers
Curaçao expatriate sportspeople in the United States
Expatriate soccer players in the United States
Dutch expatriate footballers
Dutch expatriate sportspeople in the United States